William Harrison "Bill" Cleaveland (born December 14, 1950) is an American politician and jurist. He was a Republican member of the Virginia House of Delegates 2010–2012, representing the 17th district, which included parts of Botetourt and Roanoke Counties and the city of Roanoke in the western part of the state. On January 30, 2013, he was sworn in as a judge of the General District Court of Botetourt and Craig Counties.

Electoral history
Before the 2009 elections, longtime delegate William Fralin announced his retirement. Cleaveland won a June 2011 Republican primary against four opponents, then defeated Democrat Gwen Mason in the November general election, 62 to 37 percent.

In 2011, Cleaveland opted not to run for re-election. He was replaced by Chris Head, who had finished second in the 2009 primary.

References

External links

bf3a-5650-a34e-7a0475f88f80.html?mode=jqm

Living people
Republican Party members of the Virginia House of Delegates
Virginia state court judges
1950 births
Alfred University alumni
People from St. Marys, Pennsylvania